The Journal of Anthropological Research is a quarterly peer-reviewed scientific journal covering anthropology. It was established in 1937 as the New Mexico Anthropologist, with its first issue published on March 13 of that year. At the beginning of 1945, Leslie Spier launched the journal's successor, the Southwestern Journal of Anthropology, and served as its editor until he died in 1961. The subsequent editor, Harry Basehart, changed the journal's title to its current one in 1973. It is published by the University of Chicago Press along with the journal's owner and copyright holder, the University of New Mexico. The current editor-in-chief is Lawrence Guy Straus (University of New Mexico). According to the Journal Citation Reports, the journal has a 2016 impact factor of 0.647, ranking it 55th out of 82 journals in the category "Anthropology".

References

External links

Journal of Anthropological Research at the Department of Anthropology, University of New Mexico

Publications established in 1937
Quarterly journals
University of Chicago Press academic journals
Anthropology journals
English-language journals
Academic journals associated with universities and colleges of the United States
University of New Mexico